Lindsay Clarke (born 1939, Halifax, West Yorkshire) is a British novelist. He was educated at Heath Grammar School in Halifax and at King's College, Cambridge. The landscape of hills, moors and crags around Halifax informed the growth of his imagination, while King's refined his sensibility and sharpened his intellect.

His debut novel, Sunday Whiteman, was shortlisted for the David Higham First Novel Award, and his second novel The Chymical Wedding, partly inspired by the life of Mary Anne Atwood, won the Whitbread Prize in 1989. Clarke's most recent novel is The Water Theatre (published in September 2010 by Alma Books). In her review of the novel in The Times Antonia Senior said "There is nothing small about this book. It is huge in scope, in energy, in heart...It is difficult to remember a recent book that is at once so beautiful and yet so thought provoking." The Water Theatre was selected as a winner of the inaugural Fiction Uncovered competition in 2011 and was included among The Times'''s Books of the Year. In 2012 The Water Theatre was chosen as the inaugural e-book publication of The New York Review of Books under their NYRB Lit imprint.

Before becoming a writer, Lindsay's career in education took him to Akim-Oda, Ghana, where he worked as Senior Master of a co-educational boarding school. He has also worked in the United States. He lectures in creative writing at Cardiff University, is a Creative Consultant to The Pushkin Trust in Northern Ireland, and teaches writing workshops in Frome, London and at the Arvon Foundation. He has had four radio plays broadcast on BBC Radio 4, and a number of his articles and reviews have been published in Resurgence and The London Magazine. Lindsay has one daughter from his first marriage. In 2014 he was awarded a Civil List Pension "in recognition of services to literature."

Clarke passionately believes in the power of the creative imagination and writes about imagination, consciousness and mythology in his blog.

Publications
Troy Quartet
 A Prince of Troy (2019) 
 The War at Troy (2004), 
 The Spoils of Troy (2019) 
 The Return from Troy (2005), 

NovelsSunday Whiteman (1987)The Chymical Wedding (1989)Alice's Masque (1994)Parzival and the Stone from Heaven (2001), The Water Theatre (2010)

PoetryStoker (2006), Phoenix Poetry PamphletA Dance with Hermes (2016), 

PamphletImagining Otherwise (2004), GreenSpirit Pamphlet No. 6 

Anthologies editedEssential Celtic Mythology (1997), . Reprinted as Lindsay Clarke's Traditional Celtic Stories (1999), .The Gist: A Celebration of the Imagination (2012),  (Editor)Green Man Dreaming: Reflections on Imagination, Myth, and Memory (2018), 

References

 Susan Rowland, "Writing About War: Jung, Much Ado About Nothing and the Troy Novels of Lindsay Clarke" in Journal of Jungian Scholarly Studies 3.1, 2007
 Mark F Lund, "Lindsay Clarke and A.S.Byatt: The Novel on the Threshold of Romance" in Deus Loci: The Lawrence Durrell Journal'' NS2, Vol.1, 1993

External links
Lindsay Clarke's official website
Clarke's biography at FantasticFiction
Clarke's representation at United Agents

1939 births
Living people
People from Halifax, West Yorkshire
20th-century British novelists
21st-century British novelists
Academics of Cardiff University
Alumni of King's College, Cambridge
British male novelists
English historical novelists
People educated at Heath Grammar School
Writers of historical fiction set in antiquity
20th-century English male writers
21st-century English male writers